Seamus Kennedy may refer to:

Séamus Kennedy (cyclist) (1947–2012), Irish cyclist
Séamus Kennedy (hurler) (born 1993), Irish Gaelic footballer and hurler
Seamus Kennedy (singer), singer, comedian and writer